Charlie Chaplin (1889–1977) was an English comedy actor.

Charles or Charlie Chaplin is also the name of:

 Charles Chaplin (elder) (1759–1816), British Member of Parliament for Lincolnshire 1802–1816
 Charles Chaplin (younger) (1786–1859), British Member of Parliament for Stamford 1809–1812, and for Lincolnshire 1818–1831
 Charles Joshua Chaplin (1825–1891), French painter
 Charles Chaplin Sr. (1863–1901), British music hall performer, father of Charlie Chaplin
 Charles Chaplin (artist) (1907–1987), English artist, engraver and printmaker
 Charles Chaplin Jr. (1925–1968), American actor, son of Charlie Chaplin 
 Charlie Chaplin (singer), stage name for Jamaican dancehall and ragga singer Richard Patrick Bennett
 Charles C. G. Chaplin (1906–1991), American ichthyologist and author

Other uses
 "Charlie Chaplin went to France", a skipping song
 "Charlie Chaplin", Swedish song performed by Eva Rydberg at the Melodifestivalen 1977
 "Charlie Chaplin" (song), 1978 Greek Eurovision Song Contest Entry  sung by Tania Tsanaklidou
 Charlie Chaplin (1999 film), Indian Malayalam film
 Charlie Chaplin (2002 film), Indian Tamil film starring Prabhu and Prabhu Deva

See also
Chaplin (disambiguation)
Chaplin (name)
Chaplin family for relatives of comedy actor Charlie Chaplin